Pontus Jacob Ragne Dahlberg (born 21 January 1999) is a Swedish footballer who plays as a goalkeeper for Allsvenskan club IFK Göteborg and the Sweden national team.

Club career
On 31 January 2018, Dahlberg signed for Watford on a five-and-a-half-year deal for an undisclosed fee. He was loaned back to IFK Göteborg until the end of the 2017–18 season.

On 6 August 2021, Dahlberg joined League One side Doncaster Rovers on a season-long loan deal. On 14 January 2022, Dahlberg was recalled from his loan spell at Doncaster Rovers after making 18 appearances for the club. Later that day, he joined fellow League One club Gillingham on loan for the rest of the season.

International
He made his debut for Sweden national football team on 7 January 2018 in a friendly 1–1 draw with Estonia.

Career statistics

Club

International

References

External links

1999 births
Living people
People from Ale Municipality
Association football goalkeepers
Swedish footballers
Sweden youth international footballers
Sweden under-21 international footballers
Sweden international footballers
IFK Göteborg players
Watford F.C. players
FC Emmen players
BK Häcken players
Doncaster Rovers F.C. players
Gillingham F.C. players
Allsvenskan players
English Football League players
Swedish expatriate footballers
Expatriate footballers in the Netherlands
Swedish expatriate sportspeople in the Netherlands
Expatriate footballers in England
Swedish expatriate sportspeople in England
Sportspeople from Västra Götaland County